Nagavara Ramarao Narayana Murthy  (born 20 August 1946) is an Indian billionaire businessman. He is the founder of Infosys, and has been the chairman, chief executive officer (CEO), president, and chief mentor of the company before retiring and taking the title chairman emeritus. As of October 2022, his net worth was estimated to be $4.5 billion, making him the 654th richest person in the world in 2022 according to Forbes.

Murthy was born and raised in Shidlaghatta, Karnataka. He graduated from the National Institute of Engineering, University of Mysore with a bachelor's degree in electrical engineering and a master's degree from the Indian Institute of Technology Kanpur.

Before starting Infosys, Murthy worked at the Indian Institute of Management Ahmedabad as chief systems programmer, and Patni Computer Systems in Pune, Maharashtra. He started Infosys in 1981 and was the CEO from 1981 to 2002, as well as the chairman from 2002 to 2011. In 2011, he stepped down from the board and became the chairman emeritus. In June 2013, Murthy was appointed as the executive chairman for a period of five years. 

Murthy has been listed among the 12 greatest entrepreneurs of our time by Fortune magazine. He has been described as the "father of the Indian IT sector" by Time magazine and CNBC for his contribution to outsourcing in India. In 2005, he co-chaired the World Economic Forum in Davos, Switzerland. Murthy has been honoured with the Padma Vibhushan and Padma Shri awards.

Early life and education

N. R. Narayana Murthy was born on 20 August 1946 in Sidlaghatta, a city in India's south-western state of Karnataka into a middle-class Kannada  speaking Brahmin family. After completing his school education, he went to the National Institute of Engineering and graduated in 1967 with a degree in electrical engineering. In 1969 he received his master's degree from the Indian Institute of Technology Kanpur.

Career

Murthy first worked as a research associate under a faculty at IIM Ahmedabad and then later as the chief systems programmer. There he worked on India's first time-sharing computer system and designed and implemented a BASIC interpreter for Electronics Corporation of India Limited. He started a company named Softronics. When that company failed after about a year and a half, he joined Patni Computer Systems in Pune.

Murthy mentions that being arrested and expelled for no good reason during the communist era 1974 in a border town between the Yugoslav-Bulgarian border, turned him into a "compassionate capitalist" from a "confused leftist/communist", leading him to create Infosys.
Murthy and his six software professionals founded Infosys in 1981 with an initial capital investment of Rs 10,000, which was provided by his wife Sudha Murty. Murthy was the CEO of Infosys for 21 years from 1981 to 2002 and was succeeded by co-founder Nandan Nilekani. At Infosys he articulated, designed and implemented a global delivery model for IT services outsourcing from India. He was the chairman of the board from 2002 to 2006, after which he also became the chief mentor. In August 2011, he retired from the company, taking the title chairman emeritus.

Murthy is an independent director on the corporate board of HSBC and has been a director on the boards of DBS Bank, Unilever, ICICI and NDTV. He is also a member of the advisory boards and councils of several educational and philanthropic institutions, including Cornell University, INSEAD, ESSEC, Ford Foundation, the UN Foundation, the Indo-British Partnership, Asian Institute of Management, a trustee of the Infosys Prize, a trustee of the Institute for Advanced Study in Princeton, and as a trustee of the Rhodes Trust. He is also the Chairman of the Governing board of Public Health Foundation of India. He is on the Asia Pacific advisory board of British Telecommunications.

In June 2013, Murthy returned to Infosys as executive chairman and a director. In June 2014, he stood down as executive chairman, was non-executive chairman until October, when he became chairman emeritus.

Murthy is also on the strategic board which advises the national law firm, Cyril Amarchand Mangaldas, on strategic, policy and governance issues. He is a member of IESE's International Advisory Board (IAB).

In 2016, Murthy spoke with Harvard Business Review Ascend on the subject of "How To Be a Better Manager".

In 2017, Murthy raised concerns over alleged corporate governance lapses at Infosys, however the company went on to deny these claims.

Personal life
His wife, Sudha Murty, is a businesswoman, educator, author and the chairperson of the Infosys Foundation. 

Murthy has two children, a son, Rohan Murty, and a daughter, Akshata Murty. In June 2013, Rohan joined Infosys as an executive assistant to his father. He left Infosys in June 2014. In 2009, Akshata married British politician Rishi Sunak, who later became MP for Richmond, Yorkshire, and then Leader of the Conservative Party and Prime Minister of the United Kingdom.

Awards and honours

Books
 A Better India: A Better World, Penguin Books, 2009 
 A Clear Blue Sky: Stories and Poems on Conflict and Hope, Puffin Books India, 2017 
 The Wit and Wisdom of Narayana Murthy, Hay House, 2016

References

Further reading

External links
 
 Profile at Infosys

1946 births
Living people
Recipients of the Padma Shri in trade and industry
Recipients of the Padma Vibhushan in trade & industry
Businesspeople in software
Kannada people
Indian billionaires
Businesspeople from Mysore
IIT Kanpur alumni
Academic staff of the Indian Institute of Management Ahmedabad
Trustees of the Institute for Advanced Study
Officiers of the Légion d'honneur
Honorary Commanders of the Order of the British Empire
Businesspeople from Bangalore
Infosys people
Indian software engineers
20th-century Indian engineers
20th-century Indian businesspeople
HSBC people
DBS Bank people
Unilever people
ICICI Bank
NDTV Group
British Telecom people
Cornell University staff
Academic staff of INSEAD
Indian technology company founders
United Nations Foundation
Winners of the Nikkei Asia Prize
Chevaliers of the Légion d'honneur
Murthy family
Madhva Brahmins